Kinzinger is a surname. Notable people with the surname include:

Adam Kinzinger (born 1978), American politician
Didi Contractor (1929–2021, née Delia Kinzinger), German-American architect
Tonya Kinzinger (born 1968), American actress

See also
Matt Kinsinger (born 1977), an American former Arena Football League fullback/linebacker
John W. Kintzinger (1870–1946), Iowa Supreme Court justice.

German toponymic surnames

Surnames